The Embassy is an Australian factual television series narrated by Australia actor Les Hill. The series first began airing on the Nine Network on 19 October 2014. The series was renewed for a second season which began screening from 3 February 2016. The series was renewed for a third season on 1 March 2016.

The series is based in Australia's busiest embassies and features unprecedented access as staff deal with Australians requiring diplomatic assistance.

Series overview

Episodes

Season 1 (2014) 
The first season presented the workings behind the Australian embassy in Bangkok.

Season 2 (2016-17) 
The second season featured the Australian embassy in Bangkok again, as well as those in Ho Chi Minh City and Vientiane, Laos.

Season 3 (2017) 
The third season continued to present the Australian embassy in Bangkok, while introducing those in Bali, Paris, and Madrid.

References

External links
 

2014 Australian television series debuts
Australian factual television series
English-language television shows
Nine Network original programming
Television shows set in Bangkok
Television shows set in Laos
Television shows set in Vietnam
Vientiane